Kim Tae-hyun (born 7 April 1969) is a South Korean male weightlifter, competing in the +105 kg category and representing South Korea at international competitions. He participated at the 1992 Summer Olympics in the +110 kg event, at the 1996 Summer Olympics in the +108 kg event and at the 2000 Summer Olympics in the +105 kg event. He competed at world championships, most recently at the 1999 World Weightlifting Championships.

Kim was born in Boseong County, South Jeolla Province. After his retirement from competitive weightlifting, he became a representative for a construction company.

Major results
  - 1991 World Championships Unlimited class (400.0 kg)
  - 1990 Asian Games Heavyweight class
  - 1994 Asian Games Unlimited class
  - 1998 Asian Games Unlimited class

References

External links
 
 
 
 

1969 births
Living people
People from Boseong County
Korea National Sport University alumni
South Korean male weightlifters
Weightlifters at the 2000 Summer Olympics
Olympic weightlifters of South Korea
Weightlifters at the 1990 Asian Games
Weightlifters at the 1994 Asian Games
Weightlifters at the 1998 Asian Games
Asian Games medalists in weightlifting
Asian Games gold medalists for South Korea
Weightlifters at the 1992 Summer Olympics
Weightlifters at the 1996 Summer Olympics
World Weightlifting Championships medalists
Medalists at the 1990 Asian Games
Medalists at the 1994 Asian Games
Medalists at the 1998 Asian Games
Sportspeople from South Jeolla Province
20th-century South Korean people
21st-century South Korean people